Gomphus is a genus of cantharelloid fungi in the family Gomphaceae. Once presumed to be related to chanterelles, molecular study has shown them to be allied with stinkhorns and fairy clubs. The type species of the genus is the pig's ear (G. clavatus).

Christiaan Hendrik Persoon named the genus in 1797, but did not assign any species to it at the time. The generic name is derived from the Greek  'γομφος' gomphos meaning 'plug' or 'large wedge-shaped nail'.

Species
, Index Fungorum accepts 18 species of Gomphus:
G. africanus R.H.Petersen 1976 – Africa
G. albidocarneus Villegas 2010 – southeastern Mexico

G. brasiliensis Corner 1970 – South America
G. brunneus (Heinem.) Corner 1966 – Mexico
G. calakmulensis Villegas & Cifuentes 2010 – southeastern Mexico
G. cavipes Corner 1970 – South America
G. clavatus (Pers.) Gray 1821 – Europe, North America
G. crassipes (L.M.Dufour) Maire 1937 – Spain and North Africa
G. megasporus Corner 1970 – Pakistan
G. ochraceus (Pat.) Singer 1945
G. orientalis R.H.Petersen & M.Zang 1996 – China
G. pleurobrunnescens Villegas & A.Kong 2010 – southeastern Mexico
G. szechwanensis R.H.Petersen 1972 – Tibet
G. thiersii R.H.Petersen 1971 – USA
G. yunnanensis R.H.Petersen & M.Zang 1996 – China

There are several undescribed species in the forests of Myrtle beech (Nothofagus cunninghamii) in Tasmania. Bruce Fuhrer noticed in 1992 that the large and ornamented spores of these species resembled those of the genera Ramaria and Beenakia.

References

Gomphaceae
Agaricomycetes genera
Taxa named by Christiaan Hendrik Persoon